Crystal Tamarua (born 30 July 1995) is a New Zealand rugby league footballer who plays as a  for the New Zealand Warriors in the NRL Women's Premiership and Burleigh Bears in the QRL Women's Premiership.

She is a New Zealand and Cook Islands representative.

Background
Born in Auckland, Tamarua played her junior rugby league for the Bay Roskill Vikings. Her sister, Rochelle, is a NZRL referee.

Playing career

In November 2017, Tamarua represented the Cook Islands at the 2017 Women's Rugby League World Cup.

On 1 August 2018, Tamarua joined the New Zealand Warriors NRL Women's Premiership team.

In October 2019, she was a member of New Zealand's 2019 Rugby League World Cup 9s-winning squad.

In September 2020, Tamarua was one of five New Zealand-based Warriors' players to travel to Australia to play in the 2020 NRL Women's premiership. Due to COVID-19 restrictions, the players had to quarantine for 14 days on entering Australia and 14 days on return to New Zealand when the season was completed.

On 20 February 2021, she represented the Māori All Stars in their 24–0 win over the Indigenous All Stars. She joined the Burleigh Bears QRL Women's Premiership team for the 2021 season.

In October 2022 she was selected for the New Zealand squad at the delayed 2021 Women's Rugby League World Cup in England.

References

External links
NRL profile

1995 births
Living people
New Zealand sportspeople of Cook Island descent
New Zealand Māori rugby league players
New Zealand female rugby league players
New Zealand women's national rugby league team players
Rugby league props
Rugby league second-rows
New Zealand Warriors (NRLW) players